Longshan Temple Underground Shopping Mall is an underground shopping center located in Wanhua District, Taipei, Taiwan. It is located directly below Bangka Park and is connected with Longshan Temple metro station. There are a total of 7 entrances to access the shopping mall from the ground floor. The mall has four levels. Level B1 is a famous fortune-telling street, where some stores also sell lucky charms and daily necessities; level B2 sells a variety of commodities, such as exquisite cultural goods and snacks, souvenirs, etc. Levels B3 and B4 are used as a public parking lot.

History
 Longshan Temple Underground Shopping Mall officially started operation on September 17, 2005.
 The mall underwent a large renovation starting from January 15, 2019 and reopened at the end of January 2021.

Gallery

See also
 Zhongshan Metro Mall
 Taipei City Mall
 East Metro Mall
 Ximen Metro Mall
 Station Front Metro Mall
 List of shopping malls in Taipei

References

2005 establishments in Taiwan
Semi-subterranean structures
Shopping malls in Taipei
Shopping malls established in 2005
Underground cities in Taipei